Pinoteau is a French surname. Notable people with the surname include:

Claude Pinoteau (1925–2012), French film director
Hervé Pinoteau (1927–2020), French historian
Jack Pinoteau (1923–2017), French director, brother of Claude
Xavier Pinoteau

French-language surnames